City of York was a 1,194-ton iron ship which sank after hitting a reef off Rottnest Island in the last few kilometres of its voyage from San Francisco to Fremantle, Western Australia in 1899.

The three masted, 68-metre-long (223 feet), iron-hulled ship was built in 1869 by Glasgow shipbuilders J. Elder and Company. The British owners were the 'Ship City of York Company'.

Sinking
The vessel departed San Francisco on 13 April 1899 under Captain Phillip Jones with a cargo of 743,444 feet of Oregon timber and 3,638 doors. After making a record passage to Western Australia in just 90 days she approached Rottnest from the north on the afternoon of 12 July 1899 in stormy weather including blinding rain and heavy seas. At that time, Wadjemup Lighthouse at the centre of the island was the single lighthouse on Rottnest. The ship was seen by the lighthouse keeper at 4:30 p.m. on a north-westerly bearing about 29 km (18 mi) off the coast of the island, heading north-east. 

The keeper telephoned the news of the sighting to the head pilot who was on duty in the main island settlement at Thompson Bay who readied himself and his pilot boat to go to the assistance of the ship once it signalled for a pilot.

At 6:45, the ship had still not signalled for a pilot and the assistant lighthouse keeper challenged the ship by lighting a flare at the base of the lighthouse, meaning for the ship to stand off until the pilot had arrived.

The captain however mistook the signal for the international code as being from a pilot boat itself and that the ship should continue towards it (the pilot boat). The ship was now unwittingly sailing straight towards the shallow reefs which surround the island.

Shortly after the last cast, breakers were sighted.

11 men drown 
Captain Jones ordered the 26 crew into the two lifeboats. Six men including First Mate William Pape managed to get in the first lifeboat before its holding rope broke and it drifted free from the stricken vessel. The remaining 20 men managed to get into the remaining lifeboat and stood a short distance off for an hour or so while Captain Jones considered his options. As the ship appeared to be holding steady of the reef, Jones ordered the lifeboat to return to the ship, but while doing so, the small boat was hit by a large wave and overturned, tipping all of the men into the heavy seas.

Eight men managed to re-board City of York and one man was picked up by the first mate's boat. 11 others including Captain Jones were drowned. After several hours battling the seas, the seven men in the remaining lifeboat managed to get to shore and several walked, exhausted, several kilometres through the bush to the lighthouse to raise the alarm. The remaining men onshore were recovered shortly afterwards and the following morning, the master and owner of the steam tug Dunskey, Captain William Douglas, rowed his vessel's  dinghy to the wreck from seaward and was able to rescue the remaining eight men on the ship.

Court of inquiry
An inquiry was held a week later which found that the wreck was caused by the "gross carelessness and want of judgement shown by the master, Phillip H. Jones".

The ship's owners challenged the finding, arguing that the international code of practice said that flare-ups were used as a signal from a pilot boat to show that the boat was in safe water. As was the practice, Captain Jones had replied with blue lights to signal his acknowledgement of the safe water flare-up signal. By implication, the assistant lighthouse keeper had been negligent in using an incorrect signal.

Concern about the signalling procedures grew and a Joint Select Committee of both Houses of Parliament was established to investigate the harbour and pilot services of the colony. The committee overturned the findings of the initial inquiry and exonerated Captain Jones.

The owners instituted a claim for damages of £7,000 from the Government of Western Australia on the basis that the ship was lost due to misleading signals and that the government, as operators of the lighthouse was responsible. The case was pursued as far as the Privy Council in London in October 1902. The Privy Council case was not heard however, as the respondents allowed the appeal to lapse.

A settlement of £3,000 was negotiated in early 1903.

City of York was abandoned with general agreement of there being no likelihood of the hull being salvaged. Much of the timber cargo was salvageable however and was bought for £323/5/- by a Perth syndicate who also bought the cargo from Carlisle Castle.

Current condition
It appears the vessel may have broken in two amidships with two sections of deck framing off centre. Several sections stand proud of the sea-bed. The hull has largely disintegrated with only the vessel's floors and the stern section recognisable. Plating, frames and stringers are strewn throughout the wreckage with one deck winch and sections of windlass the only machinery apparent.

The anchor from the ship has been retrieved from the wreck site and currently stands prominently outside the accommodation office on the island.

Another wreck and aftermath

The ship had been carrying general cargo as well as locking bars which were for the construction of the Goldfields Water Supply Scheme. Between 24 and 26 people were estimated to be on board. All on board were drowned. Initially, it was unclear if there was one or two shipwrecks after debris started floating ashore near South Beach in Fremantle. A pilot sent out from Fremantle ascertained the fate of Carlisle Castle at about the same time as City of York was first sighted, however delays in communications and the severe weather added to the confusing situation.

A short time after the storm, the government recognised the need for additional lighthouses to assist with navigation in the waters around the island and the approaches to Fremantle. A second lighthouse at Rottnest at Bathurst Point on the eastern end was built soon after, being completed just 13 months after the City of York incident.

A memorial at Fremantle Cemetery commemorates the lives lost in the City of York and Carlisle Castle tragedies. The memorial was built in 1900 from public subscriptions.

See also
Rottnest Island shipwrecks

Notes

References

Barques
Shipwrecks of Western Australia
Maritime incidents in 1899
Rottnest Island
1869 ships
Ships built on the River Clyde